Botond Birtalan (born 8 April 1989 in Budapest) is a Hungarian football forward player who plays for III. Kerületi TVE on loan from Vasas SC.

External links

 HLSZ 

1989 births
Living people
Footballers from Budapest
Hungarian footballers
Association football forwards
FC Sopron players
CF Liberty Oradea players
Kecskeméti TE players
Rákospalotai EAC footballers
FC Bihor Oradea players
Debreceni VSC players
Kozármisleny SE footballers
Dunaújváros PASE players
FC Tatabánya players
Békéscsaba 1912 Előre footballers
Vasas SC players
III. Kerületi TUE footballers
Nemzeti Bajnokság I players
Nemzeti Bajnokság II players
Hungarian expatriate footballers
Expatriate footballers in Romania
Hungarian expatriate sportspeople in Romania